Hugo Nevill Money-Coutts, 8th Baron Latymer (1 March 1926 – 10 November 2003) was an English banker and sailor. He inherited the title Baron Latymer from his father, Thomas Burdett Money-Coutts, 7th Baron Latymer.

Sailing 
Both Latymer and his son, Crispin, have sailed across the Atlantic.

References 

1926 births
2003 deaths
Barons Latimer
20th-century English nobility
Latymer